Caja General de Ahorros de Canarias known as Caja Canarias was a Spanish saving bank that served the Canary Islands. It was founded on March 23, 1984 as the union of Caja General de Ahorros y Monte de Piedad de Santa Cruz de Tenerife and Caja de Ahorros Insular de La Palma.  It was taken over by CaixaBank in 2012.

History
Headquartered in Santa Cruz de Tenerife. This was the first financial institution in the Canary Islands.  , the bank had over 1,600 direct employees and a network of more than two hundred offices throughout the Canary islands.

It was merged into CaixaBank in 2012 as part of a government institutional protection system (SIP) that was used as a consolidation mechanism for credit institutions in Spain.

References

External links 
 Official Website

Defunct banks of Spain
Santa Cruz de Tenerife
Banks established in 1984
Companies of the Canary Islands
CaixaBank